The 2021 Zubr Cup was a professional women's tennis tournament played on outdoor clay courts. It was the seventeenth edition of the tournament which was part of the 2021 ITF Women's World Tennis Tour. It took place in Přerov, Czech Republic between 23 and 29 August 2021.

Singles main-draw entrants

Seeds

 1 Rankings are as of 16 August 2021.

Other entrants
The following players received wildcards into the singles main draw:
  Monika Kilnarová
  Linda Nosková
  Dominika Šalková
  Darja Viďmanová

The following player received entry using a protected ranking:
  Anna Zaja

The following player received entry as a special exempt:
  Anna Sisková

The following players received entry from the qualifying draw:
  Nikola Bartůňková
  Andrea Gámiz
  Sarah Beth Grey
  Misaki Matsuda
  Tereza Mihalíková
  Park So-hyun
  Alice Ramé
  Tereza Smitková

The following player received entry as a lucky loser:
  Sára Bejlek

Champions

Singles

 Linda Nosková def.  Alexandra Ignatik, 6–7(2–7), 6–4, 6–3

Doubles

   Carolina Meligeni Alves /  Sarah Beth Grey def.  Mana Kawamura /  Funa Kozaki, 6–4, 3–6, [13–11]

References

External links
 2021 Zubr Cup at ITFtennis.com
 Official website

2021 ITF Women's World Tennis Tour
2021 in Czech tennis
August 2021 sports events in the Czech Republic